Karel Hník (born 9 August 1991) is a Czech racing cyclist, who currently rides for UCI Continental team .

Major results

2008
 3rd Junior race, National Cyclo-cross Championships
2011
 3rd Under-23 race, UCI World Cyclo-cross Championships
2012
 1st  Road race, National Under-23 Road Championships
 3rd National Cyclo-cross Championships
2013
 1st  Mountains classification Volta ao Alentejo
 2nd Coupe des Carpathes
2014
 1st  Overall Tour Alsace
1st Stage 4
 2nd Overall Istrian Spring Trophy
 3rd Overall Volta ao Alentejo
1st Stage 4
 4th Overall Troféu Joaquim Agostinho
1st Stage 3
 5th Overall Oberösterreichrundfahrt
2016
 4th Overall Czech Cycling Tour
 4th Velothon Wales
 6th Visegrad 4 Bicycle Race – GP Polski
2018
 8th Visegrad 4 Bicycle Race – GP Czech Republic
2019
 3rd Overall Tour of Bihor
 4th Overall Flèche du Sud
 8th Overall Czech Cycling Tour
 9th Overall Tour de Hongrie
 9th Overall Tour Alsace

References

External links
 

1991 births
Living people
Czech male cyclists
People from Jilemnice
Sportspeople from the Liberec Region